Jocelyn Lee may refer to:
 Jocelyn Lee (artist)
 Jocelyn Lee (actress)

See also
 Jocelyn Lee Hardy, British Army officer